Mathias de Sousa was the first Black elected representative in North America. A free man, Sousa was of African and Portuguese-Jewish descent.

Life
It is believed that Sousa's father was born in Portugal. Within colonial Maryland society, Sousa was defined as a "mulatto", a person of mixed African and European descent. Sousa worked as an indentured servant for Fr Andrew White, a Catholic priest in the Jesuits; Sousa is also believed to have been Catholic. Following his indentured servitude, which ended in 1638, Sousa worked as a fur trader and a mariner.
In March 1641, Sousa was elected as a Representative at a Maryland Assembly meeting.

Legacy
An historical marker has been erected in St. Mary's City in St. Mary's County, Maryland.

The actor Denzel Washington spent the summer of 1976 in St. Mary's City, in summer stock theater performing Wings of the Morning, the Maryland State play, which was written for him by incorporating an African-American character/narrator based loosely on de Sousa.

See also
African Americans in Maryland
History of the Jews in Maryland

References

17th-century African-American people
African-American history of Maryland
African-American state legislators in Maryland
American fur traders
American indentured servants
American people of Portuguese-Jewish descent
People of colonial Maryland
St. Mary's City, Maryland
African-American Catholics